The China Open is an annual table tennis tournament in China, run by the International Table Tennis Federation (ITTF). It is currently part of the ITTF World Tour.

History

The tournament was first held in 1988, and has featured on the ITTF World Tour's schedule every year since the Tour's inception in 1996.

China's Ma Long holds the record for most men's singles tournament wins, with eight, while Wang Nan, Zhang Yining and Li Xiaoxia of China all share the record for most women's singles tournament wins, with five each.

In August 2016, it was announced by the ITTF that Chengdu has been chosen as one of six cities to host a "World Tour Platinum" event in 2017. These events will replace the Super Series as the top tier of the ITTF World Tour.

Champions

Individual Events

1988–1989

1991–2017

2018–present

Team Events

See also
Asian Table Tennis Union
Chinese Table Tennis Association

References

External links
International Table Tennis Federation
Chinese Table Tennis Association (in Chinese)

ITTF World Tour
Table tennis competitions in China
Annual sporting events in China
Recurring sporting events established in 1988
1988 establishments in China